Heather Day is an American visual artist and entrepreneur based in San Francisco, California.

Career 
Heather Day grew up in Hawaii and along the East Coast of the United States. She graduated from the Maryland Institute College of Art in 2012 with a Bachelor of Fine Arts degree in Painting. Following graduation, she moved to San Francisco to expand her studio practice. Early in her career and after her graduation, she was outspoken about her use of social media for the promotion of the arts which was not common at that time.

Work 
Day considers her work a form of visual storytelling, where each painting acts as a page to a larger story about “risk and comfort.” Citing the lines and textures of nature, travel, music and the depth of the color blue as her main sources of inspiration, Day works primarily with paint and non-traditional materials on canvas. She also works in both interior and exterior murals and experimental sculpture. Day painted a commissioned mural at the Dropbox office in Seattle, conveying movement and creating her own canvas by painting over existing design elements such as a moose head sculpture.

Aside from working with traditional painting materials, Day used her process to create the world's first augmented reality art for Facebook Camera in collaboration with Facebook's Applied Machine Learning group.

Using her social media platform as a vehicle for community discussion, Day addresses feminism, current political events and their impacts on the community, and entrepreneurship.

Together with product manager Michelle Wei, Day co-founded a culinary-art startup company called Studio Table. Studio Table started in Day’s studio space in the Dogpatch neighborhood of San Francisco.

Her work is included in the collection of the Fort Wayne Museum of Art.

References

External links 
 Official Website
 Notable Works and Shows

1989 births
Living people
21st-century American painters
Abstract painters
American abstract artists
American contemporary painters
American women painters
Artists from Hawaii
Maryland Institute College of Art alumni
20th-century American women artists
21st-century American women artists